The 2018–19 season is Gokulam Kerala's second season since its establishment in 2017 and their second season in the I-League. Gokulam Kerala will also be involved in the Super Cup.

Review and events

I-League

Gokulam Kerala started their 2018-19 Hero I-League campaign against Mohun Bagan on 27 October 2018. The match resulted in a draw. Their first win was in their 4th match against Shillong Lajong on 11 November 2018.

Squad information

First-team squad

Transfers and loans

Transfers in

Source:

Transfers out

Source:

Pre-season and friendlies

Gokulam Kerala Played a friendly against Bengaluru FC at Sree Kanteerava Stadium in Bengaluru.

Technical staff
As of 15 April 2018.

Statistics 
As of 15 December 2018.

Squad appearances and goals

|-
! colspan=10 style=background:#dcdcdc; text-align:center| Goalkeepers

|-
! colspan=10 style=background:#dcdcdc; text-align:center| Defenders

|-
! colspan=10 style=background:#dcdcdc; text-align:center| Midfielders

|-
! colspan=10 style=background:#dcdcdc; text-align:center| Forwards

|-
! colspan=10 style=background:#dcdcdc; text-align:center| Players who have made an appearance or had a squad number this season but have left the club

|}

Squad statistics

Players Used: Gokulam Kerala has used a total of 38 different players in all competitions.

Goalscorers

Clean sheets

Disciplinary record

Competitions

Overview

I-League

Standings

Results summary

Results by round

Matchday

See also
 2018–19 in Indian football
 2018–19 I-League

References

External links
Official website

2018–19 I-League by team
Gokulam Kerala FC seasons